Their Rooms "Our Story" is the debut Korean extended play (second overall) by South Korean pop group, JYJ. The album was released in digital and physical format by January 28, 2011.

It recorded 150,000 copies in pre-orders alone and reached number 1 in various charts. The album features six tracks that were all self-written and composed. The songs "삐에로 (Pierrot)" and "Nine" were first introduced on JYJ's world tour.

Track listing

References

2011 albums
JYJ albums